Anthems for the Imperfect is the third studio album by CCM band Everyday Sunday. The album was released in 2004 through the EMI Christian Music Group.

Track listing

Personnel 

 Trey Pearson – vocals
 Jason Siemer – guitar, background vocals
 Andrew Martin – guitar, background vocals
 Dave Hunter – bass guitar
 Chris Hines – drums, background vocals

Additional personnel 

 Quinlan – guitar, background vocals
 Christa Black – violin
 John Catchings – cello
 Matt Thiessen – background vocals
 Mark Wilson – piano

References

2004 albums
Everyday Sunday albums
Flicker Records albums